Moniteau Creek may refer to:

Moniteau Creek (north central Missouri), a tributary of the Missouri River in Missouri
Moniteau Creek (south central Missouri), a tributary of the Missouri River in Missouri